Port Talbot is an industrial town in Wales.

Port Talbot may also refer to:

 Port Talbot Steelworks, an integrated steel production plant in Port Talbot
 Port Talbot (district), one of four local government districts in West Glamorgan
 Port Talbot (electoral ward), an electoral ward of Neath Port Talbot County Borough
 Port Talbot, Ontario, a community located west of Port Stanley
 Port Talbot Town F.C., a football club playing in the Welsh Premier League